Mircea Onisemiuc (born 13 September 1970) is a retired Romanian football striker and current manager.

He played 6 games in the 2. Bundesliga for Rot-Weiß Oberhausen before joining Regionalliga team VfB Oldenburg in 1999, then Oberliga team 1. FC Lok Stendal and Verbandsliga team SV Straelen.

Embarking on a coaching career, he managed Schwarz-Weiß Essen, Rot Weiss Ahlen, SSVg Velbert and MSV Duisburg's youth team.

References

1970 births
Living people
Romanian footballers
Rot-Weiß Oberhausen players
VfB Oldenburg players
1. FC Lok Stendal players
2. Bundesliga players
Regionalliga players
Association football forwards
Romanian football managers
Romanian expatriate football managers
Romanian expatriate sportspeople in Germany
Schwarz-Weiß Essen managers
Rot Weiss Ahlen managers
SSVg Velbert managers
Sportspeople from Constanța